Harmel Mosque, also known as the Kenitra Mosque, is a Tunisian mosque located at Sabaghine Street in the medina of Tunis.

History 
The mosque was built during the Hafsid reign, by Ali Thabet, one of Yusuf Dey's ministers in the 17th century.

References 

Mosques in Tunis
17th-century mosques